Three Tales  is a work by Gustave Flaubert that was originally published in French in 1877. It consists of the short stories: "A Simple Heart", "Saint Julian the Hospitalier", and "Hérodias".

"A Simple Heart" 
After her one and only love Théodore purportedly marries a well-to-do woman to avoid conscription, Felicité quits the farm where she works and heads for Pont-l'Évèque, where she picks up work in a widow's house as a servant. She is very loyal and easily lends her affections to the two children of her mistress, Mme Aubain. She gives entirely to others; although many take advantage of her, she is unaffected.

She has no husband, no children, and no property, and is reliant on her mistress to keep her; she is uneducated; her death is virtually unnoticed. Despite her life being seemingly pointless, she has within her the power to love, which she does even when she does not receive it in return. She also carries within her a yearning, a majestic quasi-religious sensibility which finds its apotheosis in the deification, as she dies, of her pet parrot, who floats above her deathbed, masquerading as the Holy Ghost. She lives a simple, unexamined life.

Flaubert's challenge was to create the main protagonist as someone very different from the satirical characters appearing in his previous novels such as Madame Bovary.

"The Legend of Saint Julian the Hospitalier" 

"The Legend of Saint Julian the Hospitalier",  in French, is a story about Julian the Hospitaller. (Note that the story has nothing to do with the Order of Hospitallers, despite the similarity of the names.) He is predicted at birth to do great things. His father is told that he will marry into the family of a great emperor, while his mother is told that he will be a saint. They dote on him. After Julian kills a mouse who interrupted his concentration in church, his cruelty towards animals grows and culminates into his massacre of an entire valley of deer. A stag curses him to kill his own parents. He almost brings the curse to fruition twice: he drops a sword while standing on a ladder near his father, and he pins his mother's white shawl against a wall with a javelin because it looked like bird's wings. He leaves to escape his future (much like Oedipus).

Julian joins a band of vagrants, and they eventually grow into a huge army under his control. He makes a name for himself and marries rich, but never hunts. Finally, his wife convinces him to go hunt, and he is haunted by the spirits of all of the animals he has killed. He returns home to surprise his wife and finds a man and a woman in her bed. Unknown to him, his parents had arrived to see him, and his wife had given them her bed. He thinks that it is another man sleeping with his wife and murders them. He recognizes his misdeed and leaves once again.

Having given all of his possessions to his wife, Julian begs for food but is shunned for his deeds. He comes across a deserted river crossing and decides to live a life of servitude. One day, there is a great storm, and a leper wishes to cross. It is rough, but Julian does not give up. Once across, the leper's requests increase. He wishes for food and wine, Julian's bed, and finally the warmth of Julian's body. When Julian gives the man everything without hesitation, the leper is revealed to be Jesus Christ himself, who takes Julian with him to heaven.

"Hérodias" 

"Hérodias" is the retelling of the beheading of John the Baptist. It starts slightly before the arrival of the Syrian governor, Vitellius. Herodias holds a huge birthday celebration for her second husband, Herod Antipas. Unknown to him, she has concocted a plan to behead John. According to Flaubert, this plan entails making her husband fall in love with her daughter, Salomé, leading to him promising her whatever she wants. Salomé, obviously in line with the instructions of her mother, will ask for John's head. Everything goes as planned. John has been repeatedly insulting the royals, so the king does not think long before granting Salomé's wish. The crowd gathered for the party waits anxiously while the executioner, Mannaeus, kills John. The story ends with some of John's disciples awaiting the Messiah.

Sources of inspiration 

 "A Simple Heart" was inspired by several events in Flaubert's own life: he also lived in a farmhouse in rural Normandy, he also was adrift in his studies, much like Paul. Most importantly, he had an epileptic seizure in the same way that Félicité does in the story.
 Gustave Flaubert wrote "A Simple Heart" under encouragement from his good friend and author George Sand.
 "The Legend of Saint Julian the Hospitalier" was inspired by a large stained-glass window at Rouen Cathedral. Flaubert deliberately made his story markedly different from the story told in glass.
 "Hérodias" is based on the biblical figure of the same name. Flaubert based the section on the dance of Salomé from a bas-relief also at Rouen Cathedral and his own experience watching a young female dancer while in Egypt.
 "A Simple Heart" was the inspiration for Flaubert's Parrot, a literary novel by Julian Barnes.
 "Hérodias" is said to have influenced Oscar Wilde's later Salome (1893) and Jules Massenet's opera Hérodiade (1881); "The Legend of Saint Julian the Hospitalier" was the basis for an opera of the same title by Camille Erlanger (1888).
 The story is described at length in Yann Martel's novel Beatrice and Virgil.
 The parrot Loulou in "A Simple Heart" makes a cameo appearance in the Nancy Drew computer game Curse of Blackmoor Manor. In the game, Loulou is known to scream "Felicity! The door, the door!" at the player whenever they walk by. Nancy on occasion will say to herself: "I wonder who Felicity is?"

References

External links 
 
  (plain text and HTML)
 [https://archive.org/details/la-legende-de-saint-julien-l-hospitalier-gustave-flaubert Enregistrement audiophonique de La Légende de saint Julien l'Hospitalier]. Audio recording of The Legend of St. Julian the Hospitalier. Christian Rist's remarkable narration and voxography performance

  
  
Three Short Works at Google Books (scanned book)
   
  Un Coeur Simple with 1,200+ English annotations at Tailored Texts
  A Simple Heart, The Legend of Saint Julian the Hospitalier and Herodias, Three Tales in audio version 

1877 short story collections
French short story collections
Works by Gustave Flaubert
Cultural depictions of John the Baptist
Cultural depictions of Salome